Mary Kennedy (born 4 October 1954) is an Irish television personality and former newscaster, and writer. She presented the Eurovision Song Contest 1995 from the Point Theatre in Dublin. She has also presented her own Saturday night chat show called Kennedy, a precursor to Saturday Night with Miriam. Kennedy was co-presenter of the magazine programme Open House with Marty Whelan. She has previously presented Up for the Match and the People of the Year Awards. She was co-presenter of Nationwide with Anne Cassin until 2019, having been so for a time with Michael Ryan.

Early life
Born in Clondalkin, Dublin, Kennedy was educated at Coláiste Bhríde in Clondalkin and University College Dublin, where she graduated with a Bachelor of Arts. She taught English in Brittany, France, before returning to her alma mater to teach Irish and English.

Broadcasting
Kennedy's broadcasting career started in 1978 when she applied for a job as continuity announcer at RTÉ. She went on to join the RTÉ News team, becoming a newscaster. She has also presented Eurovision Song Contest 1995, a Saturday night chat show called Kennedy, and was co-presenter with Marty Whelan on the magazine programme Open House.  She presented Up for the Match and the People of the Year Awards, until RTÉ replaced her in both jobs with a younger presenter, Gráinne Seoige.

Kennedy began working as Michael Ryan's co-presenter on the RTÉ local affairs show Nationwide.

In April 2008, she commented on RTÉ television coverage of the state funeral of former President of Ireland Patrick Hillery. In May 2011, she fronted RTÉ television coverage of Queen Elizabeth II's visit to Ireland. She also provided commentary at the inauguration of the ninth President of Ireland, Michael D. Higgins.

She has read the news on RTÉ Radio 1.

She has been a judge at the Rose of Tralee.

Writing
In 2003, Kennedy published her memoirs, titled Paper Tigers.

Lines I Love was shortlisted for an Irish Book Award. Lines for Living was published in 2011.

Personal life
Her niece, Clare, was the girlfriend of Garda Ciaran Jones, swept to his death in the River Liffey after he tried to help motorists during torrential rain in October 2011. Her nephew is singer-songwriter, Dermot Kennedy.

Awards
Kennedy was voted VIP magazine's "Most Stylish Woman in Ireland" in 2003.

|-
| 2003 || Mary Kennedy || "Most Stylish Woman in Ireland" (VIP) || 
|-
| 2011 || Lines I Love || Irish Book Award || 
|-

See also
 List of Eurovision Song Contest presenters

References

External links

1954 births
20th-century Irish people
21st-century Irish people
Living people
Irish television talk show hosts
Irish writers
People from Clondalkin
Rose of Tralee
RTÉ newsreaders and journalists
RTÉ television presenters
Irish women writers
Irish women radio presenters
Irish women television presenters
Irish women journalists